Jan Lammers (born 10 May 1995) is a Dutch professional footballer who plays as a centre back for De Graafschap.
 He formerly played for RKC Waalwijk, Borneo and TOP Oss.

Career
Lammers is a youth exponent from De Graafschap. He made his professional debut on 13 September 2014 in an Eerste Divisie game against SC Telstar. He replaced Robin Pröpper after 63 minutes in a 3-2 home win.

After having spent some months playing in Indonesia for Borneo, Lammers returned to the Netherlands, where he signed for Eerste Divisie club TOP Oss on 12 March 2020.

In June 2022, Lammers returned to De Graafschap on a free transfer, signing a two-year contract.

Career statistics

References

External links

1995 births
Living people
People from Zevenaar
Dutch footballers
De Graafschap players
RKC Waalwijk players
Borneo F.C. players
TOP Oss players
Eredivisie players
Eerste Divisie players
Association football defenders
Dutch expatriate footballers
Dutch expatriate sportspeople in Indonesia
Expatriate footballers in Indonesia
Association football central defenders
Footballers from Gelderland
21st-century Dutch people